Microcoelia exilis, commonly known as the pinhead orchid,  is a species of flowering plant in the orchid family, Orchidaceae. It is a leafless epiphyte, a perennial herb that grows in a tangled cluster of roots and stems on the branch of a tree. This orchid is native to tropical central and eastern Africa and was first described in 1830 by the English botanist John Lindley.

Description
The much-branched aerial roots may be either broad or slender and form a tangled mass; many are not attached to the substrate. Each inflorescence has fifty or more minute white flowers with yellowish-green, globose spurs.

Distribution and habitat
Microcoelia exilis is native to tropical central and eastern Africa. Its range includes Uganda, Kenya, Tanzania, the Democratic Republic of Congo, Malawi, Zambia, Zimbabwe, Mozambique and South Africa.

Ecology
In the Southern African Sand Forest, a region of ancient dunes in southern Mozambique and northern KwaZulu-Natal, trees such as Newtonia hildebrandtii, Cola greenwayi and Drypetes arguta are swathed in epiphytes including Microcoelia exilis, and  Usnea and other species of lichen.

Culivation
This orchid is sometimes cultivated as a houseplant, attached to a twig and misted at intervals. Trade in this orchid is regulated under CITES Appendix II.

References

Orchids of Africa
Angraecinae
Plants described in 1830